Girolamo D'Auria (1577–1620) was an Italian sculptor, active mainly in Naples, Italy. His first name is variously used as Hieronymus, Ieronimo, Hieronimo, Jeronimo, Geronimo or Gerolamo. Girolamo's father, Giovanni Domenico D'Auria, and Annibale Caccavello, were pupils of Giovanni da Nola.
his main task was sculpting funereal monuments including some in Santi Severino e Sossio, the church of Santa Maria di Monteoliveto, and the monument of Giovanni Alfonso Bisvallo, sculpted in 1617 at San Severo al Pendino.

References

1577 births
1620 deaths
16th-century Italian sculptors
Italian male sculptors
17th-century Italian sculptors
Renaissance sculptors